Alice is a thematic television channel, dedicated to cooking. Broadcasting began in 2000, both on digital terrestrial television and on satellite with the satellite platform Tivù Sat, both on channel 41.

See also
Daniele Persegani
Alice Kochen
Tivù Sat

Notes

External links
 Official website

Television channels in Italy
Television channels and stations established in 2000
Italian-language television stations